Nina Susann Åström (née Lindkvist, born 1962), is a Finland Swede Christian singer-songwriter and evangelist. 

Åström got into songwriting in her early twenties and the years that followed saw the development of a singer accompanying herself with the piano.
She began to perform regularly towards the end of the 1980s with this style. Her first album, Person 2 Person, was released in 1992, produced by Martin Kantola.

Åström's musical career got a boost when she was invited to perform at the Christian Artists Seminar in the Netherlands in 1992. Through this event she was invited to perform on a Dutch TV program. The producer of the program, Gerrit aan't Goor, liked the act so much that he offered to become her manager. Aan't Goor was then the main lyric writer for Åström's compositions up until 2003. During these years Åström collaborated with Luca Genta, Ralph van Manen, Buddy Miller, Julie Miller and Phil Keaggy, to name a few. 
Nina Åström's pop/folk style of music has drawn influences from artists like James Taylor, The Carpenters, Stevie Wonder and Jennifer Warnes.

Nina represented Finland in the Eurovision Song Contest in the year 2000 with the song "A Little Bit" (aan't Goor/Genta)

Nina Åström performs regularly outside of her native Finland – all in all she has worked in over 30 countries. In 2001 a completely new area opened for her when she was asked to join Ilkka Puhakka and Reijo "Klinu" Loikkanen for evangelistic tours in Russian prisons. Since then she has been touring regularly in some 400 prisons and drug rehab centers, particularly within the former Soviet Union countries.

In her home town/province Kokkola, Nina Åström has acted as a UNICEF goodwill ambassador.

A new creative period for Åström started with Landscape of My Soul -album that was released in 2007. According to critics and fans this album was her best so far. This album also saw the re-claiming of lyric writing for her own compositions. Moreover, this was the first time the artist produced her own album.

The momentum carried on, and in 2010 The Way We Are was released – 9 out of 11 of the lyrics on this album are penned by Åström. This album was recorded in London and produced by Dan Weeks and Matt Weeks. 

A new Finnish language album was released in the spring of 2012, under the name Avoin taivas. The lyrics are by Hilja Aaltonen and most compositions by Hannu Huhtala. This album was produced by Markus Vainiomäki. Avoin taivas sold gold in Finland in June 2013. The same personnel was involved in Minun aarteeni, released in 2014. A second Christmas album, Joulun kuningas was released in November 2014.
A Finnish-language album "Takaisin kotiin" with mainly Nina's own compositions was released in April 2016; produced by Markus Vainiomäki and Mikael Bergholm.
In the fall of 2016 a biography "Nina Åström Toisin silmin" on Nina's work and life came out, written in Finnish by Leevi Launonen. 

Once again produced and arranged by Markus Vainiomäki, the album Rauhaa ja rohkeutta was released in 2018; an album of timeless hymns including (in Finnish) e.g. Holy Holy Holy, All the way my Savior leads me and Be Thou my vision. In 2019 Nina released a long awaited album in her other native language, Swedish, Frid och frimodighet. The album includes hymns in their Swedish version from Rauhaa ja rohkeutta and two new Swedish translations of the well-known Finnish songs Anna sade, Jumala (from the album Avoin taivas) and Vain yksin Jeesus. 
Also in 2019 Nina released an English compilation album, including new recordings of her "trademark" song Freedom within prison walls and the album title song Give me Jesus. 

Nina Åström Youtube Channel  contains her music and regular posts of her video blog both in Finnish and English.

Passing on the experience and skill has become increasingly important to Nina Åström; she teaches seminars and does coaching/mentoring both in Finland and abroad on what it means to be a Christian artist and communicator.
The musicians that have been accompanying Åström for many years are Kaarle Mannila (percussions, vocals) and Kimmo Suomela (guitars). In 2014 Jim Hakola joined the team as Nina's manager and percussionist.

Personal life 

Nina Åström (née Lindkvist) was born on the Swedish-speaking west coast of Finland. She is one of three siblings.
She went to school in Kokkola, graduated from high school in 1981, and got her MA in 1986, University of Turku  (English philology major).
She is married to Benni Åström, and the couple has twin daughters Wilma and Natalie .
During short periods of her professional life Nina Åström has also taught the English and Swedish language.

Nina became a Christian when she was 17 after some years of battling with the questions of salvation, and surrender to Jesus. When Nina is not traveling in music or ministry, she is re-charging her batteries at home; often with reading and spending time with family and friends. The sea, open landscapes and beautiful trees are things that easily catch her attention – even for a longer time.
Language(s) is a passion for Åström – she is a fluent speaker of Finnish, Swedish and English; in addition to that she speaks a couple of other languages. 

C.S. Lewis, Tim Keller and Watchman Nee, among others, have had significant impact on Nina through literature/sermons.
The people that Nina meets, the places and events – these are intertwined in her thinking into song lyrics or otherwise presented thoughts. The basic foundation for her life and thinking is her relationship with Jesus Christ.

Discography 

 Person 2 Person (1992)
 A Matter of Time (1993)
 Moods (1995)
 A Friend (1999)
 A Little Bit of Love (2000)
 Vierelle jäät (Finnish version of "A Friend") (2000)
 Merry Christmas Jesus (2001)
 Real Life (2003)
 Landscape of My Soul (2007)
 The Way We Are (2010)
 Avoin taivas (2012)    Gold album in Finland (2013)
 Minun aarteeni (2014)]
 Joulun kuningas (2014)
 Takaisin kotiin (2016)
 Rauhaa ja rohkeutta (2018)
 Frid och frimodighet (2019) (Swedish version of Rauhaa ja rohkeutta)
 Give me Jesus (2019)

And a wealth of songs recorded/appearances on various special projects and compilations.

Other 
 Nina Åström Toisin silmin; biography by Leevi Launonen (2016)
 Nina Åström lukee Luukkaan tekstejä; audio book (2016)

See also 
 List of Finnish singers

References 

Sana-lehti 13–14, 2012

Hufvudstadsbladet 10.2.2010

External links 

 

Eurovision Song Contest entrants for Finland
Eurovision Song Contest entrants of 2000
20th-century Finnish women singers
People from Kokkola
Swedish-speaking Finns
Folk-pop singers
University of Turku alumni
1962 births
Living people
Teachers of English as a second or foreign language
21st-century Finnish women singers